Deepavali is a 1960 Telugu-language Hindu mythological film, produced by K. Gopala Rao under the Aswaraja Pictures banner and directed by S. Rajinikanth. It stars N. T. Rama Rao and Savitri, with music composed by Ghantasala. This is  third film  of N. T. Rama Rao as Lord Krishna. The film is a box hit and celebrated 100 days, despite releasing  only 6 days after Bhatti vikramarka. It was dubbed in 1974 in Kannada as Narakasura Vadhe,

Plot
The film begins with Narakasura born to Bhoodevi and Lord Vishnu during the time of Varaha Avatar, a wild boar form. Narakasura conquers the entire world and makes Prakjothishapuram as his capital. He also wants to conquer heaven, so, he does penance for Lord Siva and gets a boon that except for his mother Bhoodevi, no one else can kill him. Narakasura then wins over the entire universe and takes Deva Maata Aditi Devi's earrings and all heavenly ladies to his capital in a procession. Nagadatta is a citizen at Prakjothishapuram and a great devotee of Lord Vishnu. Unfortunately, his son comes into the procession and dies under a chariot. Nagadatta opposes the cruelty of Narakasura and he is arrested. In spite of Nagadatta's daughter, Vasumathi requests Narakasura to keep a deaf ear. Distressed, Vasumathi bangs her head to Siva's idol and she is cursed by a Saint to become a snake. When she explains to him about her condition, the Saint tells him she can take revenge on Narakasura in snake form. Nagadatta escapes from jail and reaches Dwaraka along with Vasumathi, where Lord Vishnu has taken birth as Lord Krishna. Narakasura discovers this, in disguise, he reaches Dwaraka, marries Vasumathi by cheating and takes them back. Narakasura imprisons Nagadatta again. Vasumathi realizes that she is married to Narakasura, but she becomes obedient to him. Narakasura's atrocities increase, causing both gods and humans to suffer. Narada reaches the earth and requests Krishna to put an end to it and restore peace, but he replies that he can't do so because of his word, which was given to Bhoodevi.

Meanwhile, Vasumathi gives birth to Bhagadatta. Vasumati tells her father that she will make his son as a devotee to Lord Krishna. Listening to this, Narakasura becomes angry and arrests Vasumathi too. Krishna appears to Nagadatta in the prison and is caught by soldiers. Krishna then transforms himself into Narada and develops devotion towards Krishna among soldiers. Meanwhile, Satyabhama could not find Krishna in the palace, she accuses Narada that he is trying to separate Krishna from her. Krishna comes there and tells her about Narakasura's misdeeds and orders Narada to observe his actions. Narakasura comes to Dwaraka in Krishna's attire and takes away all the girls from there. The public suspects Krishna and they plead to Satyabhama for their daughters. Krishna tells her that it is the atrocity of Narakasura. Satyabhama says that they have to take revenge over this. At the same time, Nagadatta escapes with Vasumathi. Narakasura catches them and removes Nagadatta's eyes. Narada takes him to Krishna. Every one requests Krishna to see the end of Narakasura. Krishna starts for war. Vasumathi obstructs Narakasura and he runs a chariot over her. Satyabhama accompanies Krishna in war. During the time of war, Krishna pretends as if he has fainted. Then Satyabhama takes the arrow and grounds Narakasura. Then he realizes that Satyabhama is none other than his mother Bhoodevi. Satyabhama requests Krishna to make Narakasura's name permanent then Krishna says that on the day when Narakasura realized his soul, people will celebrate Deepavali by lighting lamps.

Cast
N. T. Rama Rao as Lord Krishna
Savitri as Sathyabhama and Bhoodevi 
Krishna Kumari as Rukmini
S. V. Ranga Rao as Narakasura 
Kanta Rao as Narada Maharshi
Ramana Reddy as Sishyasurudu
Gummadi as Nagadatta
S. Varalakshmi as Vasumathi
Rushyendramani as Deva Maata Aditi Devi

Soundtrack

Music composed by Ghantasala. Lyrics were written by Samudrala Sr. Music released by H.M.V. Audio Company.

References

External links
 

Hindu mythological films
Films scored by Ghantasala (musician)
Films based on the Mahabharata